Iphigenia is a 1977 Greek film directed by Michael Cacoyannis, based on the Greek myth of Iphigenia, the daughter of Agamemnon and Clytemnestra, who was ordered by the goddess Artemis to be sacrificed. Cacoyannis adapted the film, the third in his "Greek tragedy" trilogy (after the released of Electra in 1962 and The Trojan Women in 1971), from his stage production of Euripides' play Iphigenia at Aulis. The film stars Tatiana Papamoschou as Iphigenia, Kostas Kazakos as Agamemnon and Irene Papas as Clytemnestra. The score was composed by Mikis Theodorakis.

Iphigenia was nominated for one Oscar, Best Foreign Language Film. It was also nominated for the Palme d'Or at the 1977 Cannes Film Festival. Iphigenia received the 1978 Belgian Femina Award and received the Best Film Award at the 1977 Thessaloniki Film Festival, where Tatiania Papamoschou also received the Best Leading Actress Award for her role as Iphigenia.

Plot

"Iphigenia" relates the story of an incident that took place just prior to the Trojan War. Helen, wife of Menelaus, king of Sparta, had eloped to Troy with Paris, son of King Priam. Menelaus' brother, Agamemnon, King of Argos, had assembled a huge Greek expeditionary force on the shores of Aulis that he planned to lead to Troy in order to reclaim his brother's wife. The Goddess Artemis, taking revenge for an insult done to her by Agamemnon's father, King Atreus, created a meteorological problem by sending storms, or calms, to prevent the Greek fleet from sailing to Troy. This is where the film begins.

The Greek armies have waited for what seems an eternity for the winds to rise, blow eastward and carry their boats to Troy. The men are tired, bored, hungry, as well as anxious to go into battle. In a public relations gesture intended to placate the men, Agamemnon (Costa Kazakos) directs them to go and help themselves to a flock of sheep that belong to the nearby temple dedicated to Artemis. In the ensuing mayhem, Artemis' sacred deer is accidentally slain. Calchas (Dimitris Aronis), high priest of Artemis' temple, is incensed by the sacrilege. He delivers an oracle to Agamemnon, with Menelaus (Kostas Karras) and Odysseus (Christos Tsagas) also present. The oracle, according to Calchas emanating from Artemis herself, demands that Agamemnon offers a sacrifice to atone for the defiling of the holy ground and the killing of the sacred stag. Once the sacrifice is made, Artemis will consent for the armies to sail to Troy by allowing the winds to blow eastward. The sacrifice is to be Agamemnon's first-born daughter, Iphigenia (Tatiana Papamoschou). The news of "the deal" soon spreads through the armies' ranks, although the nature of the sacrifice remains temporarily unknown to them.

After considerable argument and recrimination between the two brothers, Agamemnon sends a message to his wife Clytemnestra (Irene Papas), in Argos. In his letter, Agamemnon is asking his wife to send their daughter Iphigenia, to Aulis, ostensibly to wed Achilles (Panos Mihalopoulos). Achilles, leader of the Mymirdon army, is a member of Agamemnon's expeditionary forces. Against her husband's instructions, Clytemnestra decides to accompany her daughter to Aulis.

From this point forward to the climax, the tempo and the development of the tragedy stretches tighter. Agamemnon has second thoughts about his plan. After confessing his ruse to his old servant (Angelos Yannoulis), Agamemnon dispatches him with another letter to Clytemnestra that reveals the truth and tells her to cancel Iphigenia's trip. The old man is intercepted on the road by Menelaus' men and returned to Aulis. In the ensuing confrontation, Menelaus rebukes his brother for betraying the honor of Greece for his personal benefit. Agamemnon argues persuasively and convinces Menelaus that no war is worth the life of a child. Following their understanding, Agamemnon decides to personally carry the letter to Clytemnestra, but is too late. A messenger announces the imminent arrival of the wedding party, which includes Clytemnestra. Agamemnon is stunned by the announcement and he resigns himself to the worst: "From now on fate rules. Not I."

Clytemnestra arrives at Aulis filled with happiness over her daughter's prospective wedding the famous Myrmidon leader, Achilles. Iphigenia's first meeting with her father is couched in double entendre which is devastating: as she talks about her upcoming wedding, he talks about her upcoming sacrifice. They use the same words, but the meanings could not be more horribly apart. When Agamemnon meets with Clytemnestra, he still vainly tries to convince her to return to Argos without witnessing the "wedding." Clytemnestra and Achilles soon learn the truth from Agamemnon's old servant. Achilles is overcome with shame and rage when he learns of the deceit that has involved him in this tragedy. Clytemnestra rises into a fury and in desperation, confronts her husband one last time. Agamemnon, however, is trapped in his own web and cannot now back down, as Odysseus has threatened to inform the army of the exact nature of the sacrifice if Agamemnon does not follow through on the oracle's demand.

Meanwhile, preparations for the sacrifice are proceeding. "Let's not delay, the wind is rising," says Calchas. Odysseus finally forces the situation when he tells the army who is to be the sacrificial victim. Now, there is no turning back. Iphigenia briefly escapes, but she is soon recaptured by Odysseus' soldiers. In a poignant scene, suggestive of the scene of the slowly dying sacred stag at the beginning of the film, Iphigenia is caught lying down, panting and out of breath, "dying," on the forest floor. Her captors return her to the camp to face her executioners. Now resigned to her fate, she has a last, heartrending meeting with her father, before walking up the hill toward her final destiny. While Agamemnon, surrounded by his cheering army, watches helplessly on the steps below, Iphigenia reaches the top and is quickly grabbed by Calchas. At that same moment, upon seeing the wind rising. Agamemnon runs up the steps and as he reaches the top of hill, his face reflects what is assumed to be the sight of the dead Iphigenia. A strong wind now blows. The men run to the beach, push their ships into the sea and sail toward Troy and its promised treasures.

Cast

 Irene Papas as Clytemnestra
 Tatiana Papamoschou as Iphigenia
 Kostas Kazakos as Agamemnon
 Costas Carras as Menelaus
 Christos Tsagas as Odysseus
 Panos Mihalopoulos as Achilles
 Dimitri Aronis as Calchas

Divergences from the original play

Cacoyannis made a number of changes to Iphigenia at Aulis in order to adapt it to modern cinema, some of them significant divergences from the original plot. Cacoyannis does away with the traditional Greek tragic chorus originally employed to explain key scenes, replacing it in some cases with a chorus of Greek soldiers. He adds new characters who were not present, but who were mentioned, in the original play, Odysseus and Calchas, to further the plot and voice certain themes.

As in Euripides' original work, Cacoyannis deliberately renders the ending ambiguous. Though Greek myth states that Iphigenia was miraculously saved by the deities at the moment of her death, this event is not directly depicted in either the play or the film, leaving Iphigenia's true fate in question although Agamemnon's expression leaves little doubt that her death, in fact, has just taken place. In Euripides' Iphigenia at Aulis, Iphigenia's rescue is described second-hand by a messenger. In the film, there is no overt reference to this event: the audience sees clouds and mist, followed by a shot of Agamemnon's shocked expression.

DVD
Iphigenia was released on DVD by MGM Home Entertainment on July 24th, 2007 as a Region 1 DVD.

See also

 Iphigeneia
 Iphigeneia at Aulis
 Iphigeneia in Tauris
 List of historical drama films
 Greek mythology in popular culture
 List of submissions to the 50th Academy Awards for Best Foreign Language Film
 List of Greek submissions for the Academy Award for Best Foreign Language Film

References

External links 
 
 

1977 films
1977 drama films
Greek drama films
1970s Greek-language films
Films based on ancient Greek plays
Films based on works by Euripides
Films directed by Michael Cacoyannis
Films set in ancient Greece
Films set in Greece
Films based on classical mythology
Trojan War films
Films scored by Mikis Theodorakis
Cultural depictions of Achilles
Agamemnon
Works based on Iphigenia in Aulis